Alle Psallite Cum Luya is an anonymous three-part Latin motet  from the late 13th or early 14th century. It is recorded in the Montpellier Codex and is thought to have originated in France. The text is based on the word Alleluia, which is repeated throughout in the tenor voice while the duplum and triplum voices sing lines with successively longer tropes inserted between alle and luya, as follows:

   Alle psallite cum luya
   Alle concrepando psallite cum luya
   Alle corde voto Deo toto, psallite cum luya
   Alleluya

The troped text consists of a series of enthusiastic affirmations, giving the piece a celebratory tone.

References

External links
Sheet music for Alle Psallite cum Luya
Alle psallite cum luya performed live at A Mediæval Celebration at the Adelaide Fringe Festival, 2011

Anonymous musical compositions
13th century in music
Medieval compositions